Ashish Kothari is an Indian environmentalist working on development, environment interface, biodiversity policy, and alternatives. He is one of founders of Kalpavriksh, a Non-Profit Organisation in India which deals with environmental and development issues. He has been associated with peoples' movements like Narmada Bachao Andolan and Beej Bachao Andolan. Kothari has also been a teacher of environment at Indian Institute of Public Administration, New Delhi. He has also been a guest faculty at several universities and institutes and Mellon Fellow at Bowdoin College, USA.

Ashish Kothari has been a member of Steering Committees of the World Commission on Protected Areas (WCPA) and IUCN Commission on Environmental, Economic, and Social Policy (CEESP) from 1998 to 2008 .He has also been a co-chair IUCN Inter-commission Strategic Direction on Governance, Equity, and Livelihoods in Relation to Protected Areas (TILCEPA) from 1998 to 2008. Ashish Kothari has also served on the steering group or governing board of the CBD (Convention on Biodiversity) Alliance, the ICCA Consortium, and Greenpeace International.  At present, he is the chairman Greenpeace India's Board.

Ashish Kothari has also worked as members of several Government of India committees, including Environmental Appraisal Committee on River Valley Projects of the Ministry of Environment and Forests, the committee to Assess Implementation of the Forest Rights Act, and
Committees to draft design the National Wildlife Action Plan and India's Biological Diversity Act. He coordinated the National Biodiversity Strategy and Action Plan process in India commissioned by the Government of India. Kothari is currently coordinating the Vikalp Sangam (Alternatives Confluence) process which provides a forum for organisations and individuals working on development alternatives across India to come together. Since early 2016 Ashish is co-coordinator of the Academic-Activist Co-produced Knowledge for Environmental Justice (ACKnowl-EJ) project, an international, multi-partner process sponsored by the International Social Science Council. In 2019 he co-created the Global Tapestry of Alternatives process.

Ashish Kothari has authored and co-authored a few books on India's Environment, birds and biodiversity.

Education
Ashish Kothari is a graduate in Sociology from Hindu College, University of Delhi in 1983. He subsequently pursued master's of arts in Sociology from Delhi School of Economics, University of Delhi in 1985.

Publications

Books
 Kothari, Ashish. 1993. Beyond the Biodiversity Convention: A View from India. Biopolicy International 13. ACTS Press, Nairobi. Pp. v+37. .
 Kothari, Ashish, Singh, Neena, and Suri, Saloni (eds). 1996. People and Protected Areas in India: Towards Participatory Conservation. Sage Publications, New Delhi. Pp. 276, 1 map.  (US-hb); 0-8039-9334-X (US-pb); 81-7036-568-6 (India-hb); 81-7036-569-4 (India-pb).
 Kothari, Ashish. 1997. Understanding Biodiversity: Life, Equity, and Sustainability. Orient Longman, Tracts for the Times, New Delhi. Pp. xv+161. 
 Kothari, Ashish, Vania, Farhad, Das, Priya, Christopher, K., and Jha, S. 1998. Building Bridges for Conservation: Towards Joint Management of Protected Areas in India. Indian Institute of Public Administration, New Delhi. Reprint by Nataraj Publishers, Dehra Dun. .
 Kothari, Ashish, Pathak, Neema, Anuradha, R.V, and Taneja, Bansuri (eds.). 1998. Communities and Conservation: Natural Resource Management in South and Central Asia. Sage Publications and UNESCO, New Delhi. Pp. 508, 3 maps, 5 illustrations.  (US-hb); 0-7619-9280-4 (US-pb); 81-7036-739-5 (India-hb); 81-7036-740-9 (India-pb)
 Upadhyay, Sanjay and Kothari, Ashish. 2001. National Parks and Sanctuaries in India: A Guide to Legal Provisions. Print World, Allahabad. Pp. ix+68.
 Saberwal, Vasant, Rangarajan, Mahesh, and Kothari, Ashish. 2001. People, Parks and Wildlife: Towards Co-existence. Orient Longman, Tracts for the Times, New Delhi. 
 Borrini-Feyerabend, Grazia, Kothari, Ashish, and Oviedo, Gonzalo. 2004. Indigenous and Local Communities and Protected Areas: Towards Equity and Enhanced Conservation. IUCN and Cardiff University Best Practice Protected Area Guidelines No. 11. IUCN, Gland, Switzerland. Xviii+111pp. 
 Borrini-Feyerabend Grazia, Pimbert, Michel, Farvar, Taghi, Kothari, Ashish, and Renard, Yves. 2004. Sharing Power:  Learning by doing in Co-Management of Natural Resources throughout the World. International Institute of Environment and Development and IUCN/CEEESP/CMWG, Cenesta, Teheran. Reprinted by Earthscan, London, in 2007. 
 Lockwood, Michael, Worboys, Graeme, and Kothari, Ashish. (eds.). 2006. Protected Area Management: A Global Guide. Earthscan, London. 
 Amend, T., Brown, J., Kothari, A., Phillips, A. and Stolton, S. (eds). 2008. Protected Landscapes and Agrobiodiversity Values. Volume 1 in the series Values of Protected Landscapes and Seascapes. IUCN and GTZ, Kasparak Verlag, Heidelberg. 
 Kothari, A. 2007. Birds in Our Lives. Universities Press, Hyderabad. ; 10: 81-7371-586-6
 Shrivastava, A. and Kothari, A. 2012. Churning the Earth: The Making of Global India. Viking/Penguin, New Delhi. 
 Kothari, A. with Corrigan, C., Jonas, H., Neumann, A., and Shrumm, H. (eds). 2012. Recognising and Supporting Territories and Areas Conserved By Indigenous Peoples And Local Communities: Global Overview and National Case Studies. Secretariat of the Convention on Biological Diversity, ICCA Consortium, Kalpavriksh, and Natural Justice, Montreal, Canada. Technical Series no. 64, 160 pp.  (print); 92-9225-425-1 (web version)
 Kothari, A. 2014. Wildlife in a City Pond. Pratham Books, Bangalore. . (translated into 5 other languages, including कोठारी, अ, २०१४, शहरी ताल का जादू, पथम बुक्स, बेनगलोर)
 Worboys, G., Lockwood, M., Kothari, A., Feary, S. and Pulsford, I. (eds). 2015. Protected Area Governance and Management. ANU Press, Canberra.  (paperback); 9781925021691 (ebook)
 Kothari, A. 2015. Shero to the Rescue. Kalpavriksh, Pune. 
 Shrivastava, A. and Kothari, A. 2016. Prithvi Manthan (Hindi). Rajkamal Paperbacks, Delhi. .
 Kothari, A. and Joy, KJ (eds). 2017. Alternative Futures: India Unshackled. AuthorsUpFront, Delhi.

Presentations
 2nd Sanjay Ghose Peace Chair lecture, Bikaner, 4.7.2013
 Mahatma Gandhi Memorial Lecture, RTM Nagpur University, Nagpur, India, 1.12.2014
 Inaugural address at Fireflies Dialogue on 'Sustainable Journeys', Bengaluru, India, 5.2.2016
 Keynote address at '5th International Degrowth Conference', Budapest, Hungary,2.9.2016
 Inaugural speech, Orientation program, M.A in Environmental Studies,
 Malayalam University, Pune, India, 24.3.2017
 Keynote address at 'Buen Vivir and other Postdevelopment Pathways', University of Florida Center for Latin American Studies 67th Annual Conference, Gainesville, USA, 19.3.2018 address at 'National Workshop on Human Rights and Environment', Ramanujan College, Delhi, India, 14.3.2018
 Keynote address at '2nd Biannual Conference of Political Ecology Network (POLLEN) 2018', Oslo, Norway, 21.6.2018

References

Scientists from Maharashtra
Living people
Indian ecologists
Scientists from Pune
Delhi School of Economics alumni
1961 births